Anselmo Gonçalves Cardoso (born 6 January 1984 in Freiria, Torres Vedras), known simply as Anselmo, is a Portuguese former professional footballer who played as a striker.

References

External links

1984 births
Living people
People from Torres Vedras
Portuguese footballers
Association football forwards
Primeira Liga players
Liga Portugal 2 players
Segunda Divisão players
S.C.U. Torreense players
C.F. Estrela da Amadora players
C.D. Nacional players
Rio Ave F.C. players
Portimonense S.C. players
Persian Gulf Pro League players
Tractor S.C. players
Mesaimeer SC players
Qatar Stars League players
Qatari Second Division players
Portuguese expatriate footballers
Expatriate footballers in Iran
Expatriate footballers in Qatar
Portuguese expatriate sportspeople in Iran
Portuguese expatriate sportspeople in Qatar
Sportspeople from Lisbon District